Mountain is an unincorporated community in Ritchie County, West Virginia, United States. The community was known as Mole Hill prior to 1949, when residents requested that the name be changed to Mountain as part of a publicity stunt to literally make a mountain out of a molehill. Despite the name, there is no mountain in or even visible from the community. The post office ultimately closed on November 9, 2002.

The community most likely was named after the local Mole family.

References

Unincorporated communities in Ritchie County, West Virginia
Unincorporated communities in West Virginia